Telugucinema.com is an entertainment website that features information, news, and reviews on Telugu films. It is the first website that was established on the internet focusing on Telugu film industry. It is founded in 1997 by Prasad V. Potluri in Pittsburgh, United States. The site is particularly known for its long-form articles on yesteryear film personalities, retrospectives of classic films etc. It is also known for its extensive archive of interviews with people related to Telugu cinema.

It features film news, reviews, box office collections, trailers, interviews, movie schedules, photo galleries and other features related to Telugu cinema. The site is primarily monetized through advertising. Telugucinema.com is considered to be among the most popular websites related to Telugu film industry. The current publisher, editor, and chief critic of the website is Jalapathy Gudelli.

History 
Telugucinema.com is a website covering all things related to the Telugu film industry. It was founded by Prasad V. Potluri in Pittsburgh, United States in 1997.

In 2006, the site was warned not to carry film reviews anymore. The reason being that the reviews posted on the website after the preview shows apparently affected the box office collections, according to distributors. The website now has an extensive archive of film reviews.

Features 
Telugucinema.com is particularly known for its long-form articles on yesteryear film personalities, retrospectives of classic films, seminal events in the film industry etc. The site also features film news, reviews, box office collections, trailers, interviews, movie schedules, photo galleries and other features related to Telugu cinema.

Team 
The current publisher, editor, and chief critic of the website is Jalapathy Gudelli, a journalist and film critic with more than 20 years of experience. Sri Atluri and M Patnaik are other contributors to the site.

Reception 
In April 2006, Y. Sunita Chowdhary of The Hindu called the website 'a big hit'. She also mentioned that the site has loyal visitors.

Anjali Gera Roy, a professor at IIT Kharagpur, in her 2012 book The Magic of Bollywood: At Home and Abroad mentioned Telugucinema.com as one of the most successful sites devoted to Indian cinema in a particular language.

Swarnavel Eswaran Pillai, an associate professor at Michigan State University, in his 2015 book Madras Studios: Narrative, Genre, and Ideology in Tamil Cinema noted, "Sites like Telugucinema.com are doing an excellent job in creating a space for serious discussion on cinema".

References 

Indian film websites
Film review websites
Internet properties established in 1997
Telugu cinema
1997 establishments in India